The 2014–15 season was the 36th season of top-tier competitive association football played by Kitchee SC, a professional football club based in Mong Kok, Kowloon, Hong Kong. Their first-place finish in the Hong Kong Premier League meant it was their second successive championship in Hong Kong's top division, and seventh overall.

Season overview

Pre-season
In May, following the conclusion of the 2013–14 season, chairman Ken Ng revealed that Kitchee would host French Champions Paris Saint-Germain on the 29th of July at the Hong Kong Stadium. At the press conference where this information was first revealed to the public, Ng detailed both clubs' ambitions with scheduling the friendly match, stating that Kitchee "would like to present the best football clubs to fans in Hong Kong every year and especially this year, following the World Cup. Paris Saint-Germain will be led by their world class star, Zlatan Ibrahimović, and the match against Kitchee will serve as Paris Saint-Germain’s final preparation before the team travel to Beijing for the French Super Cup.”

Paris Saint-Germain defeated Kitchee 6–2 in the July 29th friendly. Juan Belencoso headed in the opening goal at the five minute mark, but PSG's Hervin Ongenda equalized seven minutes later. Jean-Christophe Bahebeck and Zlatan Ibrahimović contributed to Paris Saint Germain's dominating performance with a brace and a hat-trick, respectively. Alex Tayo Akande netted a stoppage time goal on the counter attack to close the scoring.

Squad

League table

Match details

Key

Premier League

Senior Shield

FA Cup

League Cup

AFC Cup

Group stage

Pre–season and friendlies

References

Kitchee SC seasons
Hong Kong football clubs 2014–15 season